Una mujer is a Mexican telenovela produced by Miguel Ángel Herros for Televisa in 1978.

Cast 
Elsa Aguirre as Marisa
Gustavo Rojo as Manuel
María Rivas
Miguel Ángel Ferriz as Beto
Blanca Guerra as Mabel
Martha Navarro
Dolores Camarillo "Fraustita"
Humberto Zurita as Javier
Arturo Cobo
Tony Carbajal
Aldo Monti

References

External links 
 

Mexican telenovelas
1978 telenovelas
Televisa telenovelas
Spanish-language telenovelas
1978 Mexican television series debuts
1978 Mexican television series endings